The Ministry of Colleges and Universities is the ministry of the Government of Ontario responsible for administration of laws relating to post-secondary education. This ministry is one of two education ministries, the other being the Ministry of Education (responsible for primary and secondary schools across Ontario). The Ministry's offices are in downtown Toronto. The current minister is Jill Dunlop.

History
In May 1964, the Department of University Affairs Act was passed establishing the Department of University Affairs. The department was charged with administering the government's support programs for higher education, previously the responsibility of the Department of Education. Bill Davis, the inaugural minister, was the Minister of Education at the time and continued to hold the position after the department's establishment.

In addition to jurisdiction over higher education, the department also had financial jurisdiction over the Royal Ontario Museum, the Royal Botanical Gardens and the Art Gallery of Ontario. In October 1971, the department's size was doubled by the addition of the Applied Arts and Technology Branch of the Department of Education. In light of this expansion of functions, the name of the department was changed to the Department of Colleges and Universities.

It was renamed the Ministry of Colleges and Universities in 1972 as part of a government-wide restructuring. In 1975, various cultural programs and institutions of the ministry were transferred to the newly created Ministry of Culture and Recreation.

In 1985, a separate Ministry of Skills Development was created. In 1993, the Ministry of Colleges and Universities, the Ministry of Education and the Ministry of Skills Development were combined to form the Ministry of Education and Training.

In June 1999, the responsibilities for post-secondary education and skills development were again given to a standalone ministry, named the Ministry of Training, Colleges and Universities.  Briefly between 2016 and 2018, it was renamed the Ministry of Advanced Education and Skills Development.

In October 2019, training and skills development was moved to the Ministry of Labour and the ministry was renamed the Ministry of Colleges and Universities.

Governance

The Minister of Colleges and Universities is a member of the Executive Council of Ontario (or cabinet) reporting to the Premier and held accountable by the Legislative Assembly of Ontario. The deputy minister manages the operations of the ministry that includes five main divisions. As a whole, the ministry has responsibility for administration of laws relating to post-secondary education and skills training in Ontario. The divisions cover employment and training, post-secondary education, strategic policy and programs, corporate management and services, and French-language education and educational operations. The divisions report to the deputy minister who then reports to the minister. The ministry works with several external advisory bodies to assist in the governance of the higher education system in Ontario.

Function 
In addition to being responsible for the administration of policies, laws, and funding relating to Ontario's 24 colleges and 22 universities, the Ministry of Colleges and Universities is also responsible for the registration of private career colleges as well as financial aid through the Ontario Student Assistance Program (OSAP).

Ministry Agencies 

 Higher Education Quality Council of Ontario 
 Ontario Research Fund Advisory Board 
 Postsecondary Education Quality Assessment Board 
 Training Completion Assurance Fund Advisory Board

Reports

Rae Report, 2005

The Rae Report, officially titled Ontario: A Leader in Learning, called for deregulation of tuition fees, income-contingent loan repayments, and an increase in public funding.

List of ministers

See also
Higher education in Ontario

References

Notes

Citations

Colleges and Universities
1999 establishments in Ontario
Ontario
Higher education in Ontario
Ontario, Colleges and Universities